The James D. Calhoun House is a historic house in Lincoln, Nebraska. It was built in 1889 by Charles W. Bean for James D. Calhoun, who served in the Confederate States Army during the American Civil War of 1861-1865 before moving to Nebraska, where he was the editor of the Lincoln Weekly Herald from 1887 to 1894 and the Nebraska State Journal from 1880 to 1886. The house was designed in the Queen Anne style from plans published by architect Robert W. Shoppell. It has been listed on the National Register of Historic Places since April 26, 2002.

References

National Register of Historic Places in Lincoln, Nebraska
Queen Anne architecture in Nebraska
Houses completed in 1889
1889 establishments in Nebraska